Nova 96.9 (call sign: 2SYD) is a commercial radio station operating in Sydney, Australia.

The station is owned by NOVA Entertainment along with sister station, smoothfm 95.3

Audience
In 2014 Nova had a 4% share of the Sydney audience on average, which is en par with rival ABC FM. Kate, Tim & Marty was the highest rated Nova show receiving 2.9% of Sydney's Drive time audience. Smallzy's Surgery receives a 0.5% share for the nighttime slot and Fitzy & Wippa received an 0.9% of Sydney's Breakfast audience.

In November 2014, Nova held a 0.7% for breakfast and 2.6% share for drive time.

History
One of the driving forces behind the creation of Nova was the growing demographic of youth who were embracing the commercialised anti-pop movement fronted by such artists as Daft Punk and Spiderbait, but for whom Triple J, operated by the publicly funded Australian Broadcasting Corporation, had no commercial incentives to offer. Initially the music selection on Nova 96.9 was very similar to that of Triple J, and a number of the station presenters, most notably former breakfast hosts Merrick and Rosso, which were also former Triple J staff. However, while Triple J has retained its alternative style, Nova has drifted towards a more commercial format. Meanwhile, other stations have adopted Nova's more varied programming style, to the point where Nova is now hard to tell apart from other commercial FM stations.

Along with its sister stations Nova 100 Melbourne, Nova 106.9 Brisbane, Nova 91.9 Adelaide and Nova 93.7 Perth, Nova claims to be Australia's leading brand in the Women of the 45-54 Age demographic.

Nova 96.9 are major sponsors of A-League club Sydney FC and Australian Football League (AFL) club the Greater Western Sydney Giants.

Programs

Weekdays 
Fitzy & Wippa with Kate Ritchie 6:00am–9:00am
 Jamie Row 9:00am–11:00am
 Nova Boy's Jams 11:00am–12:00pm
 Ben, Liam & Belle's Lunch Break 12:00pm–1:00pm
 Mel Tracina 1:00pm–2:00pm
 The Chrissie Swan Show 2:00pm–4:00pm
 Ricki-Lee, Tim & Joel 4:00pm–6:00pm
 Fitzy & Wippa (Best of) 6:00pm–7:00pm
 Smallzy's Surgery 7:00pm-10:00pm (Mondays to Thursdays)
 Fresh 40 with Smallzy 7:00pm–10:00pm (Fridays)
 Late Nights with Mason Tucker 10:00pm–1:00am
 Overnights with Alice Cooper 1:00am–5:00am

Weekends 
 Nova Weekends 12:00am–12:00am 
 Ben, Liam & Belle around Australia 6:00am–10:00am (Sunday)
 Nova's Live and Unrestricted 10:00am–12:00pm (Saturday)

News
 Matt de Groot (Breakfast)
 Michelle Stephenson (National Drive/National News Manager)
 Katie Hill (weekends)

References

External links 
 1Radio - Click & listen to Nova 96.9
 Nova 96.9 FM Website 
 NOVA Entertainment

Nova Entertainment
Radio stations in Sydney
Contemporary hit radio stations in Australia
Radio stations established in 2001
Nova (radio network)